Saint-Alban is a commune in the Haute-Garonne department in southwestern France.

Population

Twin towns
Saint-Alban is twinned with:

  Salgareda, Italy, since 1989
  Brzeziny, Poland, since 2010

See also
Communes of the Haute-Garonne department

References

Communes of Haute-Garonne